Abdul Hakim Jan was an anti-Taliban militia leader in Kandahar, Afghanistan. He was killed in a suicide bombing while at a dog fight, on February 17, 2008.
The suicide attack that killed him was described as "the deadliest attack of its kind in Afghanistan since the fall of the Taliban", killing approximately 80 people. Abdul Hakim Jan was said to be the target.

Hakim Jan was a former provincial police chief, prior to the Taliban's assumption of power.
Wolesi Jirga representative Khalid Pashtoon described him as the only leader to have opposed the Taliban. In October 2007, following the death of Mullah Naqib, he was considered a candidate for leader of the Alokozais tribe.  
The Globe and Mail described him as "relatively uneducated".

References 

Politicians of Kandahar Province
People of the Soviet–Afghan War
Year of birth missing
2008 deaths
Afghan warlords
Pashtun people
Afghan government officials